Hurricane Tomas was a moderately powerful Atlantic hurricane which was the most recent storm in a calendar year to strike the Windward Islands. The nineteenth named storm and twelfth hurricane of the 2010 Atlantic hurricane season, Tomas developed from a tropical wave east of the Windward Islands on October 29. Quickly intensifying into a hurricane, it moved through the Windward Islands and passed over Saint Lucia. After reaching Category 2 status on the Saffir-Simpson scale, Tomas quickly weakened to a tropical storm in the central Caribbean Sea, due to strong wind shear and dry air. Tomas later regained hurricane status as it reorganized near the Windward passage.

Throughout the hurricane's path, 44 people are known to have been killed, 8 of whom were in Saint Lucia. In the wake of the storm in Haiti, flooding intensified a cholera outbreak indirectly causing more fatalities. However, direct impacts from the hurricane in Haiti were less than anticipated. Overall damage from the storm was $463.4 million.

Meteorological history

A tropical wave exited the western coast of Africa on October 24. It moved hastily westward across the tropical Atlantic at a comparatively low latitude, becoming embedded within the Intertropical Convergence Zone. During this time the wave's structure retained a vigorous appearance; the western portion contained scattered convection, with strong thunderstorms, as well as a broad area of rotating winds. The wave and its expansive convection amplified over the next two days, featuring hints of spiraling rainbands. A Hurricane Hunters aircraft investigating the disturbance on October 29 observed a developing circulation with tropical storm-force winds at sea level.

On its inception, Tomas turned toward the northwest and decelerated within a region of low wind shear and high tropical moisture—two of the prime prerequisites of rapid intensification. A misalignment between the cyclone's low- and upper-level circulations impeded this strengthening potential, however, and at that time the NHC did not expect Tomas to attain hurricane status until 36 to 48 hours later. Steered along high pressure to its north, the storm retraced slightly west-northwestward on its approach to the Windward Islands. The center of the intensifying storm crossed southern Barbados the next morning, around 09:00 UTC. By that time, the eye measured  in diameter.

Tomas continued to strengthen through October 30 as it moved generally west- to west-northwestward. Around 20:00 UTC, the eye traversed the northern shores of Saint Vincent, while the northernmost ring of the severest winds skirted Saint Lucia. Although the NHC noted the potential for Tomas to become a major hurricane, the agency conversely observed that the hurricane had begun to suffer from southwesterly wind shear, which computer models forecast to increase in the long term. On October 31, a combination of this shear and pockets of dry air dispersed the convection surrounding the eye, initiating a weakening trend. Tomas meandered slightly south of west for a while, passing north of the ABC Islands overnight. Although the upper wind regime relaxed into the next day, with an area of deep convection briefly reblossoming near Tomas' center, the shear appeared to have already taken its toll on the storm.

Following its deterioration, Tomas diverged toward the northwest over the central Caribbean. The circulation lost further definition, adjoining a wide stretch of low pressures spanning the western Caribbean. A Hurricane Hunters mission to determine whether Tomas retained its status as a tropical cyclone found that the mean low-level circulation had reformed to the northeast of the previous center. Tomas reattained tropical storm strength late on November 3, and although the low- and mid-level centers were initially nonaligned, slow restrengthening ensued into the next day. Tomas turned northward ahead of an unseasonably strong deep-layered trough, circumnavigating the western periphery of the subtropical ridge. Over a six-hour period, the cyclone's core thunderstorm activity became much more concentrated, with a corresponding quick drop in central pressure.

Over the course of November 5, the hurricane accelerated northeastward in response to the approaching trough, passing right between eastern Cuba and western Haiti. Due to its proximity to land, the convection became disrupted near the center; Tomas reweakened to a tropical storm near the Turks and Caicos Islands during a spell of moderate shear on November 6. After moving through that island nation, Tomas briefly became a hurricane for a final time before hostile wind shear from the nearby trough fully began to take effect. In conjunction with increasingly dry air, the cyclone steadily weakened to a tropical storm on November 7. Tomas lost its tropical characteristics the next day, though it retained gale-force winds as an extratropical cyclone. It turned sharply eastward before curving northward, accelerated by a broad cyclonic steering flow over the western Atlantic the next couple of days. Tomas' extratropical remnant subsequently raced off into the north Atlantic, until it was absorbed by another extratropical system a few hundred miles south of Newfoundland, Canada, on November 11.

Preparations
Prior to the development of Tomas, the NHC noted the potential for heavy rainfall and strong wind gusts to spread across the Windward Islands, Venezuela, and northern Guyana, due to the tropical wave of which later developed into Hurricane Tomas. Upon development of Tropical Storm Tomas, most of the Windward Islands were put under a tropical storm warning, issued by their respective Governments; a tropical storm watch was also issued for Dominica. Six hours later as Tomas was nearly a hurricane, the tropical storm warning was replaced by a hurricane warning in Barbados, St. Vincent and the Grenadines, St. Lucia, and Martinique; the tropical storm watch in Dominica was also upgraded to a tropical storm warning.

In Barbados, people were able to evacuate to schools and shelters for safety during the storm. On St. Lucia, the government closed the island's two airports and ordered the closure of all businesses. Additionally, a large Creole festival was canceled due to the storm. Officials in Trinidad and Tobago closed beaches across the country.
In St. Vincent, the National Emergency Management Organization (NEMO) issued advisories that a tropical system was approaching the country. The rapid intensification of Tomas caught many citizens in St. Vincent off guard. Early on October 30, the Prime Minister addressed the nation and informed the country of the situation it was facing.

Following the west-southwesterly motion of the storm, swells generated by Tomas produced breaking waves on coastal sections of the ABC islands during the morning of November 1. Consequently, a small craft advisory was issued at 1415 UTC for all three islands. In addition, a state of severe weather was declared for Bonaire and Curaçao during the passage of Tomas. In Haiti, the country which was devastated earlier in the year from a deadly January 12 earthquake, government officials began preparing for possible impact from Tomas by October 30. One United Nations spokesperson remarked that a hurricane strike would be "the last thing Haiti needs". The Haitian government issued an orange storm alert, one level short of the highest state of alert, and warned for the possibility of winds, thunderstorms, and flooding.

Impact

Barbados and the Windward Islands

There were also reports of blown off roofs, impassable roads and uprooted trees. There was widespread damage to homes and power lines. The winds destroyed the roof of a hospital and a school, with several trees and power lines blown down.

Saint Lucia arguably had sustained the worst damage from the storm overall. Throughout Saint Lucia, severe flooding and mudslides resulted in at least 7 fatalities confirmed by the Chief Medical Officer. According to a government minister, several other people were missing and buried in landslides. By the morning of November 2, two more fatalities were confirmed on the island.

Other Caribbean Islands

While passing the Windward Islands into the Caribbean Sea, Tomas produced strong winds and heavy rainfall on Isla Aves, located off the northern coast of Venezuela.

Although the storm did not directly strike the ABC islands, one of its outer rainbands stalled over the region and intensified during the night of November 1 to 2. The majority of the rain fell overnight in a heavy downpour, accompanied by a severe thunderstorm that triggered large-scale power, TV and radio outages. Lightning strikes sparked three large fires in a major oil refinery in Willemstad. The fires inflicted severe damage to several tanks, estimated at US$10 million. Flights from Curaçao International Airport were delayed due to the hazardous conditions.

Following hours of heavy rainfall, widespread floods made most roads in the region impassable, with dozens of cars swept away or stranded. The rains filled dams and overwhelmed drains, causing them to overflow and exacerbating the flooding. The towns of Saliña, Brievengat and Mahaai were among the hardest hit; hundreds of homes, gardens and businesses were inundated. At the height of the rainstorm, a rescue worker assisting in the evacuation of a hospital was killed by the collapse of a wall. An elderly man suffering a heart attack drowned while unable to exit his flooded car. Overall, Curaçao suffered some of its worst flooding in history; insured losses across the island exceeded NAƒ110 million (US$63 million), though total damage costs from Tomas were estimated at NAƒ200 million (US$115 million).

Damage on the other two islands was much more limited. On Aruba, some thunder and moderate rainfall occurred, without significant consequences. All schools across the islands were closed on November 2 and 3 as a result of the storm.

Greater Antilles

After days of anticipation, Tomas arrived just offshore in Haiti on the morning of November 5. The storm intensified while brushing the disaster-weary nation, reattaining hurricane strength near the westernmost tip of Haiti. Torrential rains and tropical storm force winds buffeted the entire region. Within hours of the storm's arrival, flooding began to occur. In earthquake-ravaged Port-au-Prince, one of the largest refugee camps set up near the ruins of the capitol building was flooded following heavy rains. By the evening of November 8, 20 people had been confirmed dead, 7 others were listed as missing and more than 30,000 people were in shelters. Health workers also feared damage related to Tomas on the island could exacerbate the ongoing cholera outbreak.

Tomas passed just to the east of Cuba hours later, but no significant damage was reported on the island. As the outer bands of Hurricane Tomas began to impact Cuba, Aero Caribbean Flight 883, an ATR-72-212 aircraft, crashed near the town of Guasimal in Sancti Spíritus province. All 68 people on board the plane were killed on impact. Although the plane was the last to leave the airport in Santiago de Cuba before it closed due to Tomas, it is unknown what role, if any, the storm played in the crash.

Elsewhere
Hurricane Tomas narrowly missed the Turks and Caicos, sparing the islands a direct hit and causing only minor flooding.

Aftermath
Estimates place the cost of damage in Barbados at BBD$17 million (~US$8.5 million). Throughout the northern part of St. Vincent, the entire banana crop was lost. Press reports from the Prime Minister revealed that nearly every banana tree had been downed during the storm. The country's banana crop is a major source of income and jobs, accounting for roughly 60% of the workforce and 50% of the merchandise exported.

Damage from the storm on Trinidad and Tobago amounted to TTD$4 million (US$629,000). Losses in Barbados reached BBD$17 million (US$8.4 million). The Government of St. Lucia stated that damage from the storm could exceed US$100 million. By November 5, the Prime Minister stated that damage from Tomas was roughly EC$1.3 billion (US$500 million), five times higher than initially stated.

Retirement

Due to the extent of damage across the Caribbean, the name Tomas was retired from the 6-year rotating list of Atlantic hurricane names by the World Meteorological Organization on March 16, 2011, and will never again be used as a storm name in the Atlantic basin. It was replaced with Tobias, which went unused in 2016 and 2022.

See also

List of Category 2 Atlantic hurricanes
List of retired Atlantic hurricane names
Hurricane Hazel (1954)
Hurricane Noel (2007)
Hurricane Matthew (2016)

References

Further reading 
 
 
 
 

2010 Atlantic hurricane season
Category 2 Atlantic hurricanes
Hurricanes in the Leeward Islands
Hurricanes in the Windward Islands
Hurricane Tomas
Hurricane Tomas
Hurricane Tomas
Hurricane Tomas
Hurricane Tomas
Hurricane Tomas
Hurricane Tomas
Hurricane Tomas
Hurricane Tomas
Hurricane Tomas
Hurricane Tomas
Hurricanes in Barbados
Hurricanes in Dominica
Hurricanes in Martinique
Hurricanes in Saint Lucia
Hurricanes in Saint Vincent and the Grenadines
Hurricanes in Trinidad and Tobago
Hurricanes in Cuba
Hurricanes in Haiti
Hurricanes in the Turks and Caicos Islands
Retired Atlantic hurricanes
Hurricanes in the ABC Islands
Tomas